The 1999 US Open was a tennis tournament played on outdoor hard courts at the USTA National Tennis Center in New York City in New York in the United States. It was the 119th edition of the US Open and was held from August 30 through September 12, 1999.

Singles players
Men's singles

Seniors

Men's singles

 Andre Agassi defeated  Todd Martin, 6–4, 6–7(5–7), 6–7(2–7), 6–3, 6–2
• It was Agassi's 5th career Grand Slam singles title and his 2nd and last at the US Open.

Women's singles

 Serena Williams defeated  Martina Hingis, 6–3, 7–6(7–4)
• It was Williams' 1st career Grand Slam singles title.

Men's doubles

 Sébastien Lareau /  Alex O'Brien defeated  Mahesh Bhupathi /  Leander Paes, 7–6(9–7), 6–4
• It was Lareau's 1st and only career Grand Slam doubles title.
• It was O'Brien's 1st and only career Grand Slam doubles title.

Women's doubles

 Serena Williams /  Venus Williams defeated  Chanda Rubin /  Sandrine Testud, 4–6, 6–1, 6–4
 It was Serena Williams' 5th career Grand Slam title and her 3rd US Open title. It was Venus Williams' 4th career Grand Slam title and her 1st US Open title.v

Mixed doubles

 Ai Sugiyama /  Mahesh Bhupathi defeated  Kimberly Po /  Donald Johnson, 6–4, 6–4
• It was Sugiyama's 1st and only career Grand Slam mixed doubles title.
• It was Bhupathi's 2nd career Grand Slam mixed doubles title and his 1st at the US Open.

Juniors

Boys' singles

 Jarkko Nieminen defeated  Kristian Pless 6–7, 6–3, 6–4

Girls' singles

 Lina Krasnoroutskaya defeated  Nadia Petrova 6–3, 6–2

Boys' doubles

 Julien Benneteau /  Nicolas Mahut defeated  Tres Davis /  Alberto Francis 6–4, 3–6, 6–1

Girls' doubles

 Dája Bedáňová /  Iroda Tulyaganova defeated  Galina Fokina /  Lina Krasnoroutskaya 6–3, 6–4

Seeds

Men's singles
  Pete Sampras (withdrew because of a back injury)
  Andre Agassi (champion)
  Yevgeny Kafelnikov (semifinals, lost to Andre Agassi)
  Patrick Rafter (first round, lost to Cédric Pioline)
  Gustavo Kuerten (quarterfinals, lost to Cédric Pioline)
  Tim Henman (first round, lost to Guillermo Cañas)
  Todd Martin (final, lost to Andre Agassi)
  Carlos Moyà (second round retired against Nicolas Escudé)
  Greg Rusedski (fourth round, lost to Todd Martin)
  Marcelo Ríos (fourth round, lost to Nicolas Escudé)
  Mark Philippoussis (withdrew because of a left knee injury)
  Richard Krajicek (quarterfinals, lost to Yevgeny Kafelnikov)
  Àlex Corretja (first round, lost to Wayne Arthurs)
  Tommy Haas (fourth round, lost to Cédric Pioline)
  Nicolas Kiefer (third round, lost to Arnaud Clément)
  Nicolás Lapentti (second round, lost to Fredrik Jonsson)
  Félix Mantilla (first round, lost to Magnus Norman)

Women's singles
  Martina Hingis (final, lost to Serena Williams)
  Lindsay Davenport (semifinals, lost to Serena Williams)
  Venus Williams (semifinals, lost to Martina Hingis)
  Monica Seles (quarterfinals, lost to Serena Williams)
  Mary Pierce (quarterfinals, lost to Lindsay Davenport)
  Amanda Coetzer (first round, lost to Irina Spîrlea)
  Serena Williams (champion)
  Jana Novotná (third round, lost to Anke Huber)
  Julie Halard-Decugis (fourth round, lost to Lindsay Davenport)
  Arantxa Sánchez Vicario (fourth round, lost to Martina Hingis)
  Nathalie Tauziat (third round, lost to Jennifer Capriati)
  Barbara Schett (quarterfinals, lost to Venus Williams)
  Dominique Van Roost (third round, lost to Mary Joe Fernández)
  Sandrine Testud (second round, lost to Magüi Serna)
  Amélie Mauresmo (fourth round, lost to Anke Huber)
  Conchita Martínez (fourth round, lost to Serena Williams)

Withdrawals: Steffi Graf, Anna Kournikova

References

External links
 Official US Open website

 
 

 
US Open
US Open (tennis) by year
US Open
US Open
US Open
US Open